Aniceto Utset (17 January 1932 – 11 November 1998) was a Spanish professional cyclist, who was professional between from 1954 to 1961. He retired from cycling at the end of the 1961 season. He was third in the Spanish climbing championship in 1957 and made his debut in the Vuelta a España in 1958.

Biography
Aniceto Utset was born in Terrassa, Catalonia on January 1, 1932, and died in Terrassa, Catalonia at the age of 66. He finished 1st in the general classification of the 1956 Volta a Catalunya road race, and he also finished 3rd general classification of the 1958 Volta a Catalunya road race. He won the Trofeo Jaumendreu trophy in 1954.

Career
Aniceto Utset turned professional with the Mobylette team. His cycling career spanned 8 seasons. He competed as a professional with Peña Nicky's in 1954–1955 and mobylette 1956–1961. Utset contested the Vuelta a España from 1958 to 1961 and the 1959 Tour de France.

Major results

1954
 1st Trofeo Jaumendreu
 3rd Trofeo Borras
1956
 1st  Overall Volta a Catalunya
 2nd GP Martorell
 7th Trofeo Jaumendreu
1957
 1st Bellpuig
 1st Tarrasa
 3rd Montornés
1958
 3rd Overall Volta a Catalunya
1959
 1st Stage 5 Vuelta a Andalucía
1960
 3rd GP Ayutamiento de Bilbao
 3rd Trofeo Masferrer
1961
 1st Stage 7 Vuelta a Andalucía
 1st Gran Premio Ayuntamiento de Tarrega
 3rd Montblanch

Grand Tour results

Tour de France
 1959: DNF

Vuelta a España
 1961: DNF
 1958: 35	
 1961: DNF	
 1961: DNF
 1961: 41

References

External links
 

1932 births
1998 deaths
Spanish male cyclists
Volta a Catalunya cyclists
Sportspeople from Terrassa
Cyclists from Catalonia
20th-century Spanish people